Events from the year 1864 in Ireland.

Events
 1 January – civil registry of births, deaths and marriages replaces parish church registers.
 30 January – opening of the National Gallery of Ireland in Dublin.
 May – Theobald Jones presents his Report on the progress made in collecting the Irish lichens to the Natural History Society of Dublin.
 December – Jane Wilde is found to have libelled Mary Travers; Travers is awarded only a nominal farthing in damages but Lady and the newly-knighted Sir William Wilde have to pay substantial costs.
 Foundation of the Munster Bank, later rescued as the Munster & Leinster Bank, a constituent of Allied Irish Banks.

Arts and literature
Sheridan Le Fanu publishes the Gothic locked room mystery-thriller Uncle Silas (serialized July–December in his Dublin University Magazine as "Maud Ruthyn and Uncle Silas"; published December as a three-volume novel by Richard Bentley in London).

Births
31 January – Matilda Cullen Knowles, lichenologist (died 1933).
13 February – Stephen Gwynn, journalist, writer, poet and Nationalist politician (died 1950).
22 February – Michael Donohoe, Democrat U.S. Representative from Pennsylvania (died 1958).
4 March – Daniel Mannix, Catholic clergyman, Archbishop of Melbourne for 46 years (died 1963).
5 May – Henry Wilson, British Field Marshal and Conservative Party politician (killed by the Irish Republican Army 1922 in England).
11 May – Ethel Lilian Voynich, née Boole, novelist and composer (died 1960).
16 July – Joseph O'Mara, opera singer (died 1927).
1 September – Roger Casement, British diplomat, nationalist, poet and Irish revolutionary, executed at Pentonville Prison (died 1916).
19 October – Thomas Pakenham, 5th Earl of Longford, peer and soldier (died 1915).
11 November – John Meredith, Australian Army Brigadier General (died 1942).
22 November – Sir William Moore, 1st Baronet, Unionist MP and Lord Chief Justice of Northern Ireland 1925–1937 (died 1944).
9 December – Willoughby Hamilton, tennis player, Wimbledon Champion in 1890 (died 1943).
21 December – James Whiteside McCay, Lieutenant General in the Australian Army, member of the Victorian and Australian Parliaments (died 1930).
Full date unknown
William Gerard Barry, painter (died 1941).
Denis Grimes, Limerick hurler (died 1920).
Michael McCarthy, nationalist anticlerical lawyer (died 1928).
Moira O'Neill (Nesta Shakespear Higginson), poet (died 1955).
J. Laurie Wallace, painter (died 1953).

Deaths
10 January – Nicholas Callan, priest and scientist (born 1799).
20 May – John George Bowes, businessman and political figure in Canada East (b. c.1812).
18 June – William Smith O'Brien, nationalist (born 1803).
4 July – Thomas Colley Grattan, writer (born 1792).
23 July – Thomas Laughnan, soldier, recipient of the Victoria Cross for gallantry in 1857 at Lucknow, India (born 1824).
27 July – Joseph Patrick Haverty, painter (born 1794).
21 November – Charles McNally, Bishop of Clogher 1844–1864 (born 1787).
30 November – Patrick Cleburne, major general in Confederate States Army in the American Civil War, killed at the Battle of Franklin (born 1828).
8 December – George Boole, mathematician (born 1815).
23 December – James Bronterre O'Brien, Chartist leader, reformer and journalist (born 1804).
 William Guy Wall, painter (born 1792).

References

 
1860s in Ireland
Years of the 19th century in Ireland
Ireland
 Ireland